Anthony Wallace is the name of:

Anthony F. C. Wallace (1923–2015), anthropologist
Anthony Wallace (soccer) (born 1989), American soccer player
Anthony Wallace (sprinter) (born 1968), Jamaican Olympic sprinter
Tony Wallace (EastEnders), a character in British soap opera EastEnders
Tony Wallace (footballer) (born 1991), Scottish footballer